South Main Street Historic District is a national historic district located at Kernersville, Forsyth County, North Carolina.  The district encompasses 53 contributing buildings, 2 contributing sites, and 2 contributing objects in Kernersville.  They include residential and commercial buildings built between about 1834 and 1930 in a variety of popular architectural styles including Colonial Revival, Queen Anne, and Bungalow / American Craftsman style.  Located in the district is the separately listed Korner's Folly.  Other notable buildings include Spears House (c. 1834), Dr. Elias Kerner House (1857), Elias Kerner Huff House (1880), Greenfield and Kerner Tobacco Factory (1884), (former) Bank of Kernersville (1903), DeWitt Harmon's Office (c. 1928), Kernersville Moravian Church (1922), and Main Street United Methodist Church (1924/25).

It was listed on the National Register of Historic Places in 1988.

Gallery

References

Historic districts on the National Register of Historic Places in North Carolina
Queen Anne architecture in North Carolina
Colonial Revival architecture in North Carolina
Buildings and structures in Forsyth County, North Carolina
National Register of Historic Places in Forsyth County, North Carolina
Tobacco buildings in the United States